The racing of Thoroughbred horses (or gallopers, as they are also known) is a popular gaming and spectator sport and industry in New Zealand.

History

Thoroughbred horse racing commenced soon after European settlement. The first totalisator machine in the world was installed at Ellerslie Racecourse in 1913, see Sir George Julius).

Thoroughbred racing with the associated aspects such as horse breeding, training and care, race betting, race-day management and entertainment has gradually developed into an industry worth billions of dollars. The governing body is the New Zealand Thoroughbred Racing Incorporated.

Race clubs and courses of New Zealand

Thoroughbred racing is held throughout New Zealand, including courses in some of the smaller centres.

Major Thoroughbred horse races in New Zealand

Prominent people 

For further prominent people in New Zealand thoroughbred racing, see the list of honorees of the New Zealand Racing Hall of Fame.

Leading jockeys

According to www.racebase.co.nz the jockeys with over 2000 New Zealand wins are:

 2513* Chris Johnson (* as at 1/11/22, still riding)
 2451 David Walsh
 2355 Lance O'Sullivan
 2167 Noel Harris
 2156 Bill Skelton
 2131 Michael Coleman 
 2093 David Peake

As at October 2022: 
 the next highest New Zealand winners are Opie Bosson (1899*) and Darryl Bradley (1830).
 the top female jockeys are Lisa Allpress (1817) and Trudy Thornton (1163), both are still riding as at October 2022.   

In April 2014 David Walsh broke Lance O'Sullivan's record for the most New Zealand wins. On 19 December 2020, Chris Johnson took the record for New Zealand winners from Walsh when he rode Sassenach to win at Awapuni. To this date Chris has won 21 group 1 races.

In July 2020 senior jockey Michael Coleman retired after suffering injuries. He had won 39 group 1 wins in his career.

On 17 February 2021 Danielle Johnson rode her 1000th winner, when she brought home Feelin’ Fancy in race 1 at Te Aroha. Her father, Peter Johnson, rode 1370 winners in his career.

Women jockeys

Linda Jones was the first to apply for an apprentice's licence and be turned down. She had ridden in a number of lady riders events over many years in New Zealand and overseas such as in Brazil, which highlighted that New Zealand and Australia were outliers in not allowing women to compete with male jockeys in professional races.

The first win by a woman in New Zealand was visiting Canadian jockey Joan Phipps, at Te Awamutu in November 1977.

In 1977 the New Zealand Racing Conference accepted female jockeys and they became eligible to ride on 15 July 1978 with the first Kiwi woman to ride in a totaliser race in New Zealand being Joanne Hale (Giles) on that day at Waimate. Sue Day (Christchurch), Joanne Lamond (Oamaru) and Vivienne Kaye (Awapuni) rode in later races on that day.

Sue Day became the first New Zealand female jockey winner in a totalisator race against males on 22 July 1978 when she won with the Ned Thistoll-trained Jaws in the Waybrook Handicap at Timaru. Another female jockey riding then was Cherie Saxon (Hastings).

Linda Jones' first win was on Big Bickies at Te Rapa and soon after Royal Petite was the first Open Handicap winner for a female jockey. Subsequent highlight wins for Linda were Lovaro in the Queen Elizabeth Handicap and Holy Toledo in the Wellington Derby on 22 January 1979 (possibly the first female jockey world-wide to win a Derby). Linda Jones was also the first female jockey to win a professional race against males at a registered meeting in Australia, winning aboard Pay The Purple in the Labour Day Cup at Doomben, Brisbane on May 7, 1979.

Maree Lyndon was the first female jockey to win a Group I race in New Zealand when winning the 1982 New Zealand Cup on Sirtain.

Although there was resistance from some industry participants, female jockeys have competed with great skill and success.

Female riders have subsequently gone on to win the New Zealand premiership:

 Lisa Cropp (2005-2007), 970 NZ winning rides. 
 Lisa Allpress (2012, 2016, 2019 and 2020). 
 Samantha Collett (2018), 889 NZ winning rides, before moving to Australia (as at October 2022). 
 Danielle Johnson (2021).  

Other female riders of note include:

 Linda Ballentyne
 Sarah Campbell 
 Jan Cameron
 Kim Clapperton, winner of the Malaysia-Singapore premiership in 1993 and the first female jockey to ride in Hong Kong (1995). 
 Alysha Collett
 Tina Comignaghi
 Tina Egan 
 Debbie Healey
 Debbie Henderson, the first woman to win the Grand National Steeplechase, in 1994
 Michelle Hopkins
 Catherine Hutchison (formerly Tremayne)
 Leanne Isherwood 
 Maree Lyndon
 Kelly McCulloch (formerly Myers)
 Rosie Myers
 Joanne Rathbone
 Samantha Spratt, 955 NZ wins (as at October 2022)
 Trudy Thornton (formerly Archer and Collett) 
 Lee Tiley (formerly Rutherford)
 Michelle Wenn
 Kylie Williams, 839 NZ wins (as at October 2022).
 
In late February 2020 Lisa Allpress was the first female to win a thoroughbred race in Saudi Arabia on the horse Matmon at King Abdullah Aziz racetrack in Riyadh. She was competing in the inaugural International Jockeys Challenge in which she competed with 14 other jockeys including 7 women. She won the very first race in the challenge. The challenge was won by American Hall of Fame jockey Mike Smith, Swiss-born Germany based Sibylle Vogt was second while Lisa was third equal with French jockey Mickaelle Michel.

Prominent New Zealand horses

The following contains details of some of the top New Zealand horses. As well as those winning major races within New Zealand, locally owned and/or trained horses frequently go to Australia for racing campaigns or permanently due to the higher stake money in that country.

Between 1882 and  New Zealand-bred horses won Australia's Melbourne Cup 43 times. During the 2008-09 racing season 19 New Zealand-bred Thoroughbreds won 22 Group One races around the world.

Horses may also go to Asia (mainly Hong Kong or Singapore) or on occasions to Europe or the United States.

Notable sires

Recent winners of major NZ Cups 

The following are the recent winners of major cups.

 Jezabeel, who was also 2nd in the 1997 Manawatu Cup, won the 1998 Melbourne Cup

Recent winners of major NZ sprint races 

The following table contains the recent winners of major races for sprinters (generally distances of 1500m or less).

The winners of the Tarzino Trophy over 1400m are shown in the table for New Zealand's Hastings Triple Crown.

Enzo's Lad which won the Telegraph Handicap in 2018 and 2019 was 2nd in 2020.
El Chico was aged 11 when winning its second Stewards Stakes in 2011, a race record.

Recent winners of other notable Weight for Age or open races 

The following are the recent winners of other notable races.

Recent winners of major NZ 3-year-old races 

The following are the recent winners of major races for 3-year-old horses.

 The Auckland Guineas was reduced from 2100 metres to 1600 metres in 2010. The race was not run in 2014 as the race moved from Boxing Day to New Year's Day.
 The Avondale Guineas was not run in 2010 due to the race being moved from Avondale where it was run in December over 1600 metres to Ellerslie where it is run in February over 2100 metres.
 The Wellington Guineas was moved from an October meeting in 2013 to a March meeting in 2015 and from 1500m to 1400m.

Recent winners of the New Zealand Triple Crown races

The New Zealand Triple Crown, also called the Hawke's Bay Triple Crown or Hastings Triple Crown as all three races are run there, consists of:

The 1400m Challenge Stakes, which was previously known as the Makfi Challenge Stakes or Mudgway Stakes and is currently called the Tarzino Trophy, 
The 1600m Horlicks Plate, which was previously known as the Stony Bridge Stakes and is currently called the Windsor Park Plate, and
The 2040m Livamol Spring Classic, which was previously known as the Kelt Capital Stakes.

Many of New Zealand's best Thoroughbred horses have raced in the various Triple Crown events. A number of horses managed to win two of the three races and some were beaten into second in the third leg. Seachange won two of the three legs of the Triple Crown in both 2006 and 2007. On 5 October 2019 Melody Belle was the first horse to win all three of the Hastings Triple Crown races.

The Messara Report and the New Zealand Government's racing industry reforms

In April 2018 the New Zealand Government Minister for Racing, Rt Hon Winston Peters appointed an Australian, John Messara, to review the New Zealand racing industry's governance structures, and provide recommendations on future directions for the industry.

On 30 August 2018, the Minister released the report ("the Messara Report).

There was considerable media commentary regards the proposed closure of racetracks in smaller centres. During October 2018 feedback on the Messara Review was sought. In November 2018 a summary report of the submissions was compiled.

On 13 December 2018 the Minister for Racing announced a five-member Ministerial Advisory Committee to inform next steps on the Messara Review. Mr Peters appointed Dean McKenzie as chair, supported by Committee members Bill Birnie, Liz Dawson, Kristy McDonald and Sir Peter Vela.

New Zealand Thoroughbred Racing's (NZTR) Venue Plan was released in January 2019. The Report recommended:
 reducing the number of thoroughbred race tracks nationally from 48 to 27 by 2030.
 racing licences not be allocated to Stratford, Blenheim, Wairoa, Reefton, Hokitika, Waimate, Winton, Dargaville, Thames and Wyndham in the 2019/20 racing season. 
 the Stratford Racing Club track close and its race meeting be held at the Pukekura Raceway in New Plymouth.

Feedback on the document was sought, with nine regional meetings held and 75 written submissions received. NZTR chief executive Bernard Saundry said the NZTR board considered the feedback and decided the Wairoa, Blenheim and Reefton tracks would receive a reprieve, for the 2019–20 season at least.

On 17 April 2019, the Minister for Racing announced that the New Zealand Government's Cabinet had agreed to the overall intent of the Messara Report and plans to implement reforms through two Bills to amend the Racing Act 2003. The first Bill, planned to be enacted by 1 July 2019, was to begin the process of structural reform and provide financial relief to the industry.

On 20 June 2019 the Racing Reform Bill passed its third reading and final reading in Parliament.

On 5 December 2019 the Minister for Racing introduced the Racing Industry Bill as the Government's final legislative response to the recommendations of the Messara Report. It was reported in the media that the Bill extinguished the freehold property rights of local racing club owners who would be forced to sell their courses, money from any sales would not be used in that community but instead transferred to develop clubs in bigger centres elsewhere.

See also

 New Zealand Racing Hall of Fame
 New Zealand Horse of the Year
 Auckland Cup Week
 Wellington Racing Club
 Glossary of Australian and New Zealand punting
 List of Melbourne Cup winners
 Thoroughbred racing in Australia
 Harness racing in New Zealand

References

External links
 N.Z. Thoroughbred Racing Inc.
 Gambling and the TAB (Totalisator Agency Board) in New Zealand
 Hall of Fame profiles
 Feature Race Results
 Racenet - Australia's Premier Horse Racing News, Form Guides & Tips
 LOVERACING.NZ - New Zealand Thoroughbred Racing
 New Zealand Horse Racing Statistics and Information - RaceBase
 The Great Decade of New Zealand racing 1970-1980. Glengarry, Jack. William Collins Publishers Ltd, Wellington, New Zealand.
 New Zealand Thoroughbred Racing Annual 2018 (47th edition). Dennis Ryan, Editor, Racing Media NZ Limited, Auckland, New Zealand.
 New Zealand Thoroughbred Racing Annual 2017 (46th edition). Dennis Ryan, Editor, Racing Media NZ Limited, Auckland, New Zealand.
 New Zealand Thoroughbred Racing Annual 2012 (41st edition). Birch, Andrew, Editor. New Zealand Thoroughbred Marketing, Hamilton, New Zealand.
 New Zealand Thoroughbred Racing Annual 2009 (39th edition). Clark, Adrian, Editor. New Zealand Thoroughbred Marketing, Hamilton, New Zealand.
 New Zealand Thoroughbred Racing Annual 2008 (37th edition). Bradford, David, Editor. Bradford Publishing Limited, Paeroa, New Zealand.
 New Zealand Thoroughbred Racing Annual 2005 (34th edition). Bradford, David, Editor. Bradford Publishing Limited, Paeroa, New Zealand.
 New Zealand Thoroughbred Racing Annual 2004 (33rd edition). Bradford, David, Editor. Bradford Publishing Limited, Paeroa, New Zealand.
 New Zealand Thoroughbred Racing Annual 2000 (29th edition). Bradford, David, Editor. Bradford Publishing Limited, Auckland, New Zealand.
 New Zealand Thoroughbred Racing Annual 1997 (26th edition). Dillon, Mike, Editor. Mike Dillon's Racing Enterprises Ltd, Auckland, New Zealand.
 New Zealand Thoroughbred Racing Annual 1995 (24th edition). Dillon, Mike, Editor. Mike Dillon's Racing Enterprises Ltd, Auckland, New Zealand.
 New Zealand Thoroughbred Racing Annual 1994 (23rd edition). Dillon, Mike, Editor. Meadowset Publishing, Auckland, New Zealand.
 New Zealand Thoroughbred Racing Annual 1991 (20th edition). Dillon, Mike, Editor. Moa Publications, Auckland, New Zealand.
 New Zealand Thoroughbred Racing Annual 1990 (19th edition). Dillon, Mike, Editor. Moa Publications, Auckland, New Zealand.
 New Zealand Thoroughbred Racing Annual 1987 (16th edition). Dillon, Mike, Editor. Moa Publications, Auckland, New Zealand.
 New Zealand Thoroughbred Racing Annual 1986 (15th edition). Dillon, Mike, Editor. Moa Publications, Auckland, New Zealand.
 New Zealand Thoroughbred Racing Annual 1985 (14th edition). Costello, John, Editor. Moa Publications, Auckland, New Zealand.
 New Zealand Thoroughbred Racing Annual 1984 (13th edition). Costello, John, Editor. Moa Publications, Auckland, New Zealand.
 New Zealand Thoroughbred Racing Annual 1983 (12th edition). Costello, John, Editor. Moa Publications, Auckland, New Zealand.
 New Zealand Thoroughbred Racing Annual 1982 (11th edition). Costello, John, Editor. Moa Publications, Auckland, New Zealand.
 New Zealand Thoroughbred Racing Annual 1981 (10th edition). Costello, John, Editor. Moa Publications, Auckland, New Zealand.
 New Zealand Thoroughbred Racing Annual 1980 (9th edition). Costello, John, Editor. Moa Publications, Auckland, New Zealand.
 New Zealand Thoroughbred Racing Annual 1979 (8th edition).Costello, John, Editor. Moa Publications, Auckland, New Zealand.
 New Zealand Thoroughbred Racing Annual 1978 (7th edition).Costello, John, Editor. Moa Publications, Auckland, New Zealand.
 New Zealand Thoroughbred Racing Annual 1976. Costello, John, Editor. Moa Publications, Auckland.
 The DB Racing Annual 1974. Bradford, David, Editor. Moa Publications, Auckland.
 The DB Racing Annual 1972. Bradford, David, Editor. Moa Publications, Auckland.